Seán Farrell (died 1 August 1972) was an Irish politician and teacher. He was first elected to Dáil Éireann as a Sinn Féin Teachta Dála (TD) for the Leitrim–Sligo constituency at the 1923 general election. He did not take his seat in the Dáil due to Sinn Féin's abstentionist policy. He lost his seat at the June 1927 general election.

References

Year of birth missing
1972 deaths
Members of the 4th Dáil
Irish schoolteachers
Early Sinn Féin TDs